The 2009 World Running Target Championships were separate ISSF World Shooting Championships for the running target events, held in August 2009 in Heinola, Finland. Russia dominated, winning 14 of the 20 gold medals.

Medal count

Men

Men's medal match

Women

Women's medal match

Competition schedule

References
 Official schedule
 Live results

World Running Target Championships
World Running Target Championships
Shooting
2009 in Finnish sport
Sport in Heinola
Shooting competitions in Finland